The sixth season of the American political drama television series The West Wing aired in the United States on NBC from October 20, 2004, to April 6, 2005, and consisted of 22 episodes.

Plot
The sixth season opens with the Israeli and Palestinian delegations arriving at Camp David for peace talks. Despite problems at the summit, a deal is thrashed out by President Bartlet, but not before he fires Leo as chief of staff. Leo suffers a heart attack in the aftermath, leading to a re-shuffle of the White House staff. CJ Cregg becomes chief of staff but she finds it difficult to adapt, a fact not helped by the President's worsening multiple sclerosis and consequent interference from the First Lady in an effort to conserve his energy. Away from the White House, Josh convinces Texas Congressman Matt Santos to run for president, and after a shaky start, he finds himself in a three-way race for the Democratic nomination with Vice President Russell and former Vice President Hoynes. While the Republican primaries provide a clear winner in California Senator Arnold Vinick, a moderate, the Democratic ticket is not finalized until the Democratic National Convention, at which Santos is chosen as presidential nominee, with Leo McGarry as his running mate. Meanwhile, someone at the White House has leaked national security information to reporter Greg Brock.

Cast 
The sixth season had star billing for twelve major roles, with nine of these filled by returning main cast members from the fifth season. The main cast members are credited alphabetically except for Jimmy Smits and Martin Sheen, who receive the "with" and "and" credits, respectively. Smits, Alda and Channing are only credited for the episodes in which they appear.

Main cast 
 Alan Alda as Arnold Vinick
 Stockard Channing as Abbey Bartlet
 Dulé Hill as Charlie Young
 Allison Janney as C. J. Cregg
 Joshua Malina as Will Bailey
 Mary McCormack as Kate Harper
 Janel Moloney as Donna Moss
 Richard Schiff as Toby Ziegler
 John Spencer as Leo McGarry
 Bradley Whitford as Josh Lyman
 Jimmy Smits as Matt Santos
 Martin Sheen as Josiah Bartlet

Recurring cast 
Characters that returned in recurring roles were Gary Cole as Vice President Bob Russell, Tim Matheson as former Vice President John Hoynes and Mark Feuerstein as Senate Majority Counsel Clifford Calley. Roger Rees as British ambassador Lord John Marbury also returned for one episode. Kristin Chenoweth joined the recurring cast as Annabeth Schott, a former feature writer who becomes Deputy Press Secretary.  Recurring guest-star Ed O'Neill played Governor Eric Baker with Mel Harris (as Senator Rafferty) and Christopher Lloyd (portraying Lawrence Lessig) also guest-starring in one episode each. Actors who left the cast include John Amos as Chairman of the Joint Chiefs of Staff Percy Fitzwallace who was killed in the penultimate episode of the previous season, Jesse Bradford as intern Ryan Pierce and Michael Hyatt as legislative affairs advisor Angela Blake.

Episodes

Crew
The season was produced by John Wells Productions in association with Warner Bros. Television. The executive producers were the production company's namesake and founder John Wells, Christopher Misiano and Alex Graves – Llewellyn Wells (who left the show), Misiano and Graves had previously been co-executive producers in season five. Carol Flint, Peter Noah and John Sacret Young were supervising producers, and Eli Attie, Kristin Harms, Michael Hissrich and Andrew Stearn were producers. The West Wing was created by Aaron Sorkin. For the sixth season, regular staff writers were Wells, Flint, Noah, Young, Attie, Debora Cahn, Josh Singer, and former Democratic chief of staff on the Senate Committee on Finance, Lawrence O'Donnell. Cast member Bradley Whitford wrote his first episode of the series. The regular directors were Misiano and Graves, while cast member Richard Schiff directed his second episode of the series.

Reception

Critical response
On Rotten Tomatoes, the season has an approval rating of 50% with an average score of 10 out of 10 based on 6 reviews.

Accolades
The season was nominated for five Primetime Emmy Awards in 2005 without any wins. The show was nominated for Outstanding Drama Series for the sixth year running. Alan Alda, as Senator Vinick, and Stockard Channing, as Abigail Bartlet were nominated for Outstanding Supporting Actor and Outstanding Supporting Actress in a Drama Series respectively. Alex Graves was nominated for Outstanding Directing in a Drama Series and production sound mixer Patrick Hanson and re-recording mixers Dan Hiland and Gary D. Rogers were nominated in the Outstanding Single-Camera Sound Mixing for a Series category, both for the episode "2162 Votes". "2162 Votes" also got Hanson, Hiland and Rogers a Cinema Audio Society Awards nomination for Outstanding Achievement in Sound Mixing for a Television Series. The show received a nomination in the Dramatic Series category and Carol Flint received a Writers Guild of America Award nomination in the Episodic Drama category for "A Good Day". Allison Janney, as C. J. Cregg, was nominated at the Screen Actors Guild Awards for Outstanding Performance by a Female Actor in a Drama Series and the whole ensemble for the Outstanding Performance in a Drama Series award. John Wells won the Humanitas Prize in the 60-minute category for "NSF Thurmont". At the Producers Guild of America Awards ceremony in 2005, the show was nominated for the Norman Felton Producer of the Year Award – Episodic Drama. Seth Adkins, as Cody Zucker, was nominated for a Young Artist Award in the Best Performance in a Television Series (Comedy or Drama) – Guest Starring Young Actor category. Composer W. G. "Snuffy" Walden was awarded a BMI Television Award for his work on the show. The season won two Imagen Awards, a Latino awards ceremony, with the submitted work "La Palabra". Executive producers John Wells, Christopher Misiano, Alex Graves, Director Jason Ensler, writer Eli Attie, and the executive producers won Best Primetime Series and Jimmy Smits (as Matt Santos) won Best Actor in Television.

DVD release
The DVD release of season six was released by Warner Bros. first in the UK on September 26, 2005, and then in the US on May 9, 2006, after the season had completed broadcasting on television. As well as every episode from the season, the DVD release features bonus material including audio commentary on three episodes from directors and writers, and a documentary on Allison Janney's portrayal of C. J. Cregg.

All episodes from the season are available to purchase and download through Warner Bros. Studio online store, to registered users of iTunes Stores in certain countries, and in the US through Amazon Video on Demand. In Canada, the sixth season was simulcast on CTV. In the United Kingdom the series was moved from E4 to Fridays at 9:00 p.m. on sister-station More4 with the season premiering in October 2005.

References

General references

External links
 

 
2004 American television seasons
2005 American television seasons